Robert Whitehead (1823–1905) was an English engineer and entrepreneur who built the first modern torpedo.

Robert Whitehead may also refer to:

 Robert Whitehead (Derbyshire) (1856–1938), English land owner and businessman
 Robert Whitehead (theatre producer) (1916–2002), Canadian theatre producer
 Robert G. Whitehead (1916–2007), Texas businessman who created Quaker House Products
 Robert Whitehead (Virginia politician) (1897–1960), Virginia lawyer and Democratic legislator, long chief opponent of the Byrd Organization
 Bob Whitehead (born 1953), game designer and programmer
 Bob Whitehead (soccer), U.S. soccer player
 Bobby Whitehead (born 1936), English football full back
 R. Whitehead (MCC cricketer), English cricketer born ca. 1760 (first name unknown) 
 Robert E. Whitehead, American diplomat